Max Appel (born 19 March 1996) is a German rower. He competed in the 2020 Summer Olympics.

References

External links
 
 
 
 

1996 births
Living people
Rowers from Hamburg
People from Ratzeburg
Rowers at the 2020 Summer Olympics
German male rowers
Olympic rowers of Germany